"Broken Hearts" is a song by American country singer Chevel Shepherd. It is Shepherd's coronation song following her victory on the fifteenth season of The Voice. It was written by Ashley Arrison, Aben Eubanks, and Shane McAnally.

Background
"Broken Hearts" which was written by Ashley Arrison, Aben Eubanks, and Shane McAnally, was originally intended for Kelly Clarkson to record. Clarkson didn't have time to record it but still held on to it, eventually giving it to Shepherd.

Chart performance
The song debuted at number 24 on the Billboard Hot Country Songs chart, and number 1 on the Billboard Country Digital Song Sales chart.

Charts

References

2018 singles
2018 songs
Country ballads
Republic Records singles
Songs written by Shane McAnally
Songs written by Ashley Arrison